The Journal of Research in Personality is a peer-reviewed academic journal covering the field of personality psychology, published by Elsevier and edited by Zlatan Krizan. It publishes articles including experimental and descriptive research on issues in the field of personality and related fields. These can include genetic, physiological, motivational, learning, perceptual, cognitive, and social processes. Both normal and abnormal psychology, and also studies of animal personality have been published.

External links 

Personality journals
Publications established in 1988
Elsevier academic journals
English-language journals
Bimonthly journals
Differential psychology journals